Opioid use disorder (OUD) is a substance use disorder characterized by cravings for opioids, continued use despite physical and/or psychological deterioration, increased tolerance with use, and withdrawal symptoms after discontinuing opioids.  Opioid withdrawal symptoms include nausea, muscle aches, diarrhea, trouble sleeping, agitation, and a low mood. Addiction and dependence are important components of OUD.

Risk factors for OUD include a history of opioid misuse, current opioid misuse, young age, socioeconomic status, race, untreated psychiatric disorders, and environments that promote misuse (social, family, professional, etc.). Complications may include opioid overdose, suicide, HIV/AIDS, hepatitis C, and problems meeting social or professional responsibilities. Diagnosis may be based on criteria by the American Psychiatric Association in the DSM-5.

Opioids include substances such as heroin, morphine, fentanyl, codeine, dihydrocodeine, oxycodone, and hydrocodone. A useful standard for the relative strength of different opioids is morphine milligram equivalents (MME). It is recommended for clinicians to refer to daily MMEs when prescribing opioids to decrease the risk of misuse and adverse effects.

Long-term opioid use occurs in about 4% of people following their use for trauma or surgery-related pain. In the United States, most heroin users begin by using prescription opioids that may also be bought illegally.

People with an opioid use disorder are often treated with opioid replacement therapy using methadone or buprenorphine. Such treatment reduces the risk of death. Additionally, they may benefit from cognitive behavioral therapy, other forms of support from mental health professionals such as individual or group therapy, twelve-step programs, and other peer support programs. The medication naltrexone may also be useful to prevent relapse. Naloxone is useful for treating an opioid overdose and giving those at risk naloxone to take home is beneficial. In 2020, the CDC estimated that nearly 3 million people in the U.S. were living with OUD and more than 65,000 people died by opioid overdose, of whom more than 15,000 were heroin overdoses. Recent estimates of the number of people living with OUD and annual opioid overdoses worldwide are 16 million and 120,000, respectively.

Diagnosis 
The DSM-5 guidelines for the diagnosis of opioid use disorder require that the individual has a significant impairment or distress related to opioid uses. To make the diagnosis two or more of 11 criteria must be present in a given year:
More opioids are taken than intended
The individual is unable to decrease the number of opioids used
Large amounts of time are spent trying to obtain opioids, use opioids, or recover from taking them
The individual has cravings for opioids
Difficulty fulfilling professional duties at work or school
Continued use of opioids leading to social and interpersonal consequences
Decreased social or recreational activities
Using opioids despite being in physically dangerous settings
Continued use despite opioids worsening physical or psychological health (i.e. depression, constipation)
Tolerance
Withdrawal

The severity can be classified as mild, moderate, or severe based on the number of criteria present.The tolerance and withdrawal criteria are not considered to be met for individuals taking opioids solely under appropriate medical supervision.Addiction and dependence are components of a substance use disorder; addiction is the more severe form.

Signs and symptoms

Opioid intoxication 
Signs and symptoms of opioid intoxication include:
 Decreased perception of pain
 Euphoria
 Confusion
 Desire to sleep
 Nausea
 Constipation
 Miosis (pupil constriction)
Bradycardia (slow heart rate)
Hypotension (low blood pressure)
Hypokinesis (slowed movement)
Head nodding
Slurred speech
Hypothermia (low body temperature)

Opioid overdose 

Signs and symptoms of opioid overdose include, but are not limited to:<ref name=":6">Kosten TR, Haile CN. Opioid-Related Disorders. In: Kasper D, Fauci A, Hauser S, Longo D, Jameson J, Loscalzo J. eds. Harrison's Principles of Internal Medicine, 19e New York, NY: McGraw-Hill; 2014. http://accessmedicine.mhmedical.com/content.aspx?bookid=1130&sectionid=79757372 Accessed 9 March 2017.</ref> 
 Pin-point pupils may occur. Patient presenting with dilated pupils may still be experiencing an opioid overdose.
 Decreased heart rate
 Decreased body temperature
 Decreased breathing
 Altered level of consciousness. People may be unresponsive or unconscious.
 Pulmonary edema (fluid accumulation in the lungs)
 Shock
 Death

Withdrawal

Opioid withdrawal can occur with a sudden decrease in, or cessation of, opioids after prolonged use. Onset of withdrawal depends on the half-life of the opioid that was used last. With heroin this typically occurs five hours after use; with methadone, it may take two days. The length of time that major symptoms occur also depends on the opioid used. For heroin withdrawal, symptoms are typically greatest at two to four days and can last up to two weeks. Less significant symptoms may remain for an even longer period, in which case the withdrawal is known as post-acute-withdrawal syndrome.

Agitation
Anxiety
Muscle pains
Increased tearing
Trouble sleeping
Runny nose
Sweating
Yawning
Goose bumps
Dilated pupils
Diarrhea
Fast heart rate
High blood pressure
Abdominal cramps
Shakiness
Cravings
Sneezing

Treatment of withdrawal may include methadone and buprenorphine. Medications for nausea or diarrhea may also be used.

Cause
Opioid use disorder can develop as a result of self-medication. Scoring systems have been derived to assess the likelihood of opiate addiction in chronic pain patients. Healthcare practitioners have long been aware that despite the effective use of opioids for managing pain, empirical evidence supporting long-term opioid use is minimal.Noble M, Tregear SJ, Treadwell JR, Schoelles K. Long-term opioidtherapy for chronic noncancer pain: a systematic review and meta-analysis of efficacy and safety. J Pain Symptom Manag 2008;35:214–28.Kalso E, Edwards JE, Moore RA, McQuay HJ. Opioids in chronic non-cancer pain: systematic review of efficacy and safety. PAIN 2004;112:372–80 Many studies of patients with chronic pain have failed to show any sustained improvement in their pain or ability to function with long-term opioid use.Krebs EE, Gravely A, Nugent S, Jensen AC, DeRonne B, Goldsmith ES, Kroenke K, Bair MJ, Noorbaloochi S. Effect of opioid vs nonopioidmedications on pain-related function in patients with chronic back pain orhip or knee osteoarthritis pain: the SPACE randomized clinical trial. JAMA2018;319:872–82.Chaparro LE, Furlan AD, Deshpande A, Mailis-Gagnon A, Atlas S, TurkDC. Opioids compared with placebo or other treatments for chronic lowback pain: an update of the Cochrane Review. Spine (Phila Pa 1976)2014;39:556–63.

According to position papers on the treatment of opioid dependence published by the United Nations Office on Drugs and Crime and the World Health Organization, care providers should not treat opioid use disorder as the result of a weak moral character or will but as a medical condition. Some evidence suggests the possibility that opioid use disorders occur due to genetic or other chemical mechanisms that may be difficult to identify or change, such as dysregulation of brain circuitry involving reward and volition. But the exact mechanisms involved are unclear, leading to debate over the influence of biology and free will.

Mechanism
Addiction
Addiction is a brain disorder characterized by compulsive drug use despite adverse consequences. It is a component of substance use disorder and its most severe form.

Overexpression of the gene transcription factor ΔFosB in the nucleus accumbens plays a crucial role in the development of an addiction to opioids and other addictive drugs by sensitizing drug reward and amplifying compulsive drug-seeking behavior. Like other addictive drugs, overuse of opioids leads to increased ΔFosB expression in the nucleus accumbens. Opioids affect dopamine neurotransmission in the nucleus accumbens via the disinhibition of dopaminergic pathways as a result of inhibiting the GABA-based projections to the ventral tegmental area (VTA) from the rostromedial tegmental nucleus (RMTg), which negatively modulate dopamine neurotransmission. In other words, opioids inhibit the projections from the RMTg to the VTA, which in turn disinhibits the dopaminergic pathways that project from the VTA to the nucleus accumbens and elsewhere in the brain.

The differences in the genetic regions encoding the dopamine receptors for each individual may help to elucidate part of the risk for opioid addiction and general substance abuse. Studies of the D2 Dopamine Receptor, in particular, have shown some promising results. One specific SNP is at the TaqI RFLP (rs1800497). In a study of 530 Han Chinese heroin-addicted individuals from a Methadone Maintenance Treatment Program, those with the specific genetic variation showed higher mean heroin consumption by around double those without the SNP. This study helps to show the contribution of dopamine receptors to substance addiction and more specifically to opioid abuse.

Neuroimaging has shown functional and structural alterations in the brain. A 2017 study showed that chronic intake of opioids such as heroin may cause long-term effects in the orbitofrontal area (OFC), which is essential for regulating reward-related behaviors, emotional responses, and anxiety. Moreover, neuroimaging and neuropsychological studies demonstrate dysregulation of circuits associated with emotion, stress and high impulsivity.

Dependence
Opioid dependence can occur as physical dependence, psychological dependence, or both. Drug dependence is an adaptive state associated with a withdrawal syndrome upon cessation of repeated exposure to a stimulus (e.g., drug intake). Dependence is a component of a substance use disorder. Opioid dependence can manifest as physical dependence, psychological dependence, or both.

Increased brain-derived neurotrophic factor (BDNF) signaling in the ventral tegmental area (VTA) has been shown to mediate opioid-induced withdrawal symptoms via downregulation of insulin receptor substrate 2 (IRS2), protein kinase B (AKT), and mechanistic target of rapamycin complex 2 (mTORC2). As a result of downregulated signaling through these proteins, opiates cause VTA neuronal hyperexcitability and shrinkage (specifically, the size of the neuronal soma is reduced). It has been shown that when an opiate-naive person begins using opiates in concentrations that induce euphoria, BDNF signaling increases in the VTA.

Upregulation of the cyclic adenosine monophosphate (cAMP) signal transduction pathway by cAMP response element binding protein (CREB), a gene transcription factor, in the nucleus accumbens is a common mechanism of psychological dependence among several classes of drugs of abuse. Upregulation of the same pathway in the locus coeruleus is also a mechanism responsible for certain aspects of opioid-induced physical dependence.

A study compared the harm and dependence liability of 20 drugs, using a scale from zero to three for physical dependence, psychological dependence, and pleasure to create a mean score for dependence. Selected results can be seen in the chart below. Diacetylmorphine and morphine both scored highest, at 3.0.

Opioid receptors
A genetic basis for the efficacy of opioids in the treatment of pain has been demonstrated for several specific variations, but the evidence for clinical differences in opioid effects is ambiguous. The pharmacogenomics of the opioid receptors and their endogenous ligands have been the subject of intensive activity in association studies. These studies test broadly for a number of phenotypes, including opioid dependence, cocaine dependence, alcohol dependence, methamphetamine dependence/psychosis, response to naltrexone treatment, personality traits, and others. Major and minor variants have been reported for every receptor and ligand coding gene in both coding sequences, as well as regulatory regions.
Newer approaches shift away from analysis of specific genes and regions, and are based on an unbiased screen of genes across the entire genome, which have no apparent relationship to the phenotype in question. These GWAS studies yield a number of implicated genes, although many of them code for seemingly unrelated proteins in processes such as cell adhesion, transcriptional regulation, cell structure determination, and RNA, DNA, and protein handling/modifying.

118A>G variant
While over 100 variants have been identified for the opioid mu-receptor, the most studied mu-receptor variant is the non-synonymous 118A>G variant, which results in functional changes to the receptor, including lower binding site availability, reduced mRNA levels, altered signal transduction, and increased affinity for beta-endorphin. In theory, all these functional changes would reduce the impact of exogenous opioids, requiring a higher dose to achieve the same therapeutic effect. This points to a potential for greater addictive capacity in individuals who require higher dosages to achieve pain control. But evidence linking the 118A>G variant to opioid dependence is mixed, with associations shown in a number of study groups, but negative results in other groups. One explanation for the mixed results is the possibility of other variants that are in linkage disequilibrium with the 118A>G variant and thus contribute to different haplotype patterns more specifically associated with opioid dependence.

Non-opioid receptor genes
The preproenkephalin gene, PENK, encodes for the endogenous opiates that modulate pain perception, and are implicated in reward and addiction. (CA) repeats in the 3' flanking sequence of the PENK gene was associated with greater likelihood of opiate dependence in repeated studies. Variability in the MCR2 gene, encoding melanocortin receptor type 2 has been associated with both protective effects and increased susceptibility to heroin addiction. The CYP2B6 gene of the cytochrome P450 family also mediates breakdown of opioids and thus may play a role in dependence and overdose.

 Prevention 
The CDC gives specific recommendations for prescribers regarding initiation of opioids, clinically appropriate use of opioids, and assessing possible risks associated with opioid therapy. Large U.S. retail pharmacy chains are implementing protocols, guidelines, and initiatives to take back unused opioids, providing naloxone kits, and being vigilant for suspicious prescriptions. Insurance programs can help limit opioid use by setting quantity limits on prescriptions or requiring prior authorizations for certain medications.

 Opioid-related deaths 
Naloxone is used for the emergency treatment of an overdose. It can be given by many routes (e.g., intramuscular, intravenous, subcutaneous, intranasal, and inhalation) and acts quickly by displacing opioids from opioid receptors and preventing the activation of these receptors. Naloxone kits are recommended for laypersons who may witness an opioid overdose, for people with large prescriptions for opioids, those in substance use treatment programs, and those recently released from incarceration. Since this is a life-saving medication, many areas of the U.S. have implemented standing orders for law enforcement to carry and give naloxone as needed. In addition, naloxone can be used to challenge a person's opioid abstinence status before starting a medication such as naltrexone, which is used in the management of opioid addiction.

Good Samaritan laws typically protect bystanders who administer naloxone. In the U.S., at least 40 states have Good Samaritan laws to encourage bystanders to take action without fear of prosecution. As of 2019, 48 states give pharmacists the authority to distribute naloxone without an individual prescription.

Homicide, suicide, accidents and liver disease are also opioid-related causes of death for those with OUD. Many of these causes of death are unnoticed due to the often limited information on death certificates.

 Mitigation 
The "CDC Clinical Practice Guideline for Prescribing Opioids for Pain-United States, 2022" provides recommendations related to opioid misuse, OUD, and opioid overdoses. It reports a lack of clinical evidence that "abuse-deterrent" opioids (e.g., OxyContin), as labeled by the U.S. Food and Drug Administration, are effective for OUD risk mitigation. CDC guidance suggests the prescription of immediate-release opioids instead of opioids that have a long duration (long-acting) or opioids that are released over time (extended release). Other recommendations include prescribing the lowest opioid dose that successfully addresses the pain in opioid-naïve patients and collaborating with patients who already take opioid therapy to maximize the effect of non-opioid analgesics.

While receiving opioid therapy, patients should be periodically evaluated for opioid-related complications and clinicians should review state prescription drug monitoring program systems. The latter should be assessed to reduce the risk of overdoses in patients due to their opioid dose or medication combinations. For patients receiving opioid therapy in whom the risks outweigh the benefits, clinicians and patients should develop a treatment plan to decrease their opioid dose incrementally.

For more specific mitigation strategies regarding opioid overdoses, see Opioid overdose.

Management
Opioid use disorders typically require long-term treatment and care with the goal of reducing risks for the individual, reducing criminal behavior, and improving the long-term physical and psychological condition of the person. Some strategies aim to reduce drug use and lead to abstinence from opioids, while others attempt to stabilize on prescribed methadone or buprenorphine with continued replacement therapy indefinitely. No single treatment works for everyone, so several strategies have been developed including therapy and drugs.

Though treatment reduces mortality rates, the first four weeks after treatment begins and the four weeks after treatment ceases are the riskiest times for drug-related deaths. These periods of increased vulnerability are significant because many of those in treatment leave programs during these periods.

Medication
Opioid replacement therapy (ORT), also known as opioid substitution therapy (OST), involves replacing an opioid, such as heroin, with a longer-acting but less euphoric opioid.Richard P. Mattick et al.: National Evaluation of Pharmacotherapies for Opioid Dependence (NEPOD): Report of Results and Recommendation Commonly used drugs for ORT are methadone and buprenorphine, which are taken under medical supervision. , buprenorphine/naloxone is preferentially recommended, as the addition of the opioid antagonist naloxone is believed to reduce the risk of abuse via injection or insufflation without causing impairment when used appropriately (sublingual administration). Naltrexone, a μ-opioid receptor antagonist, also blocks opioids' euphoric effects by occupying the opioid receptor, but it does not activate it, so it does not produce sedation, analgesia, or euphoria, and thus has no potential for abuse or diversion. Buprenorphine, methadone, and naltrexone are approved by the U.S. Food and Drug Administration (FDA) for medication-assisted treatment (MAT). In the U.S., the Substance Abuse and Mental Health Services Administration (SAMHSA) certifies methadone opioid treatment programs (OTPs) and issues buprenorphine waivers to practitioners.

The driving principle behind ORT is the patient's reclamation of a self-directed life. ORT facilitates this process by reducing symptoms of drug withdrawal and drug cravings; a strong euphoric effect is not experienced as a result of the treatment drug. In some countries (not the U.S. or Australia), regulations enforce a limited time for people on ORT programs that conclude when a stable economic and psychosocial situation is achieved. (People with HIV/AIDS or hepatitis C are usually excluded from this requirement.) In practice, 40–65% of patients maintain abstinence from additional opioids while receiving opioid replacement therapy and 70–95% can reduce their use significantly. Medical (improper diluents, non-sterile injecting equipment), psychosocial (mental health, relationships), and legal (arrest and imprisonment) issues that can arise from the use of illegal opioids are concurrently eliminated or reduced. Clonidine or lofexidine can help treat the symptoms of withdrawal.

The period when initiating methadone and the time immediately after discontinuing treatment with both drugs are periods of particularly increased mortality risk, which should be dealt with by both public health and clinical strategies. ORT has proven to be the most effective treatment for improving the health and living condition of people experiencing illegal opiate use or dependence, including mortality reductionMichel et al.: Substitution treatment for opioid addicts in Germany, Harm Reduct J. 2007; 4: 5. and overall societal costs, such as the economic loss from drug-related crime and healthcare expenditure. A review of UK hospital policies found that local guidelines delayed access to substitute opioids, for instance by requiring lab tests to demonstrate recent use or input from specialist drug teams before prescribing. Delays to access can increase people's risk of discharging themselves early against medical advice. ORT is endorsed by the World Health Organization, United Nations Office on Drugs and Crime and UNAIDS as effective at reducing injection, lowering risk for HIV/AIDS, and promoting adherence to antiretroviral therapy.

Buprenorphine and methadone work by reducing opioid cravings, easing withdrawal symptoms, and blocking the euphoric effects of opioids via cross-tolerance, and in the case of buprenorphine, a high-affinity partial opioid agonist, also due to opioid receptor saturation. It is this property of buprenorphine that can induce acute withdrawal when administered before other opioids have left the body.

MethadoneImportant considerations when initiating methadone include the patient's opioid tolerance, the time since last opioid use, the type of opioid used (long-acting vs. short-acting), and the risk of methadone toxicity.Methadone is a full-opioid agonist used for both opioid overuse treatment and for chronic pain. It is the most commonly prescribed medication for addiction. Methadone comes in a different forms: tablet, oral solution, or an injection.

One of methadone's benefits is that it can last up to 56 hours in the body, so if a patient misses one of their daily doses (~24 hrs.), they will not typically struggle with withdrawal symptoms. Other advantages of methadone include reduction in infectious disease related to injection drug use and reduced mortality. When patients taking MAT improve and want to refrain from taking methadone, they must be properly weaned off the medication, which must be done under medical observation. Methadone has a number of serious side effects, including slowed breathing, nausea, vomiting, restlessness, and headache.

Dosages can be adjusted after 1–2 days, or another medication may be recommended for your situation if you experience side effects. Lung and breathing complications are possible long-term side effects of methadone use. Methadone, as an opiate, has the potential to be addictive. Many opponents believe that replacement drugs only substitute one addiction with another, and that methadone can be manipulated and exploited in some cases.

BuprenorphineImportant considerations when initiating buprenorphine include withdrawal symptom severity, the time since last opioid use, and the type of opioid used (long-acting vs. short-acting). Initiating buprenorphine too soon can lead to rapidly-triggered withdrawal symptoms (i.e., precipitated withdrawal). This is because buprenorphine has a high affinity for opioid receptors and is only a partial opioid agonist, meaning that as buprenorphine displaces full opioid agonists, a much weaker analgesic and euphoric effect is produced.Buprenorphine is a partial opioid receptor agonist. Unlike methadone and other full opioid receptor agonists, buprenorphine is less likely to cause respiratory depression due to its ceiling effect. This is because buprenorphine's effects do not increase linearly past moderate doses. Buprenorphine is known to be more at a risk of misuse or overdose compared to buprenorphine-naloxone and methadone, but treatment with buprenorphine may be associated with reduced mortality. Buprenorphine under the tongue is often used to manage opioid dependence. Preparations were approved for this use in the United States in 2002. A month-long injectable version of buprenorphine was approved by the FDA in 2017.

Buprenorphine/NaloxoneImportant considerations when initiating buprenorphine/naloxone include withdrawal symptom severity, the time since last opioid use, and the type of opioid used (long-acting vs. short-acting). Though not standard practice, clinicians are exploring micro-induction protocols for buprenorphine/naloxone that prioritizes rapid induction with small, increasing doses. The theoretical benefit of this form of induction is that treatment can be initiated irrespective of withdrawal symptoms.Some formulations of buprenorphine incorporate the opiate antagonist naloxone during the production of the pill form to prevent people from crushing the tablets and injecting them, instead of using the sublingual (under the tongue) route of administration. Buprenorphine/naloxone formulations are available as tablets and films. The combined tablet works via sublingual administration because buprenorphine maintains adequate bioavailability (35-55%) while naloxone doesn't (~10%). When injected, naloxone has higher bioavailability, thereby blocking the pain and craving-reducing effects of buprenorphine.

Naltrexone
Naltrexone is an opioid receptor antagonist used for the treatment of opioid addiction. Naltrexone is not as widely used as buprenorphine or methadone for OUD due to low rates of patient acceptance, non-adherence due to daily dosing, and difficulty achieving abstinence from opioids before beginning treatment. Additionally, dosing naltrexone after recent opioid use could lead to precipitated withdrawal. Conversely, naltrexone antagonism at the opioid receptor can be overcome with higher doses of opioids. Naltrexone monthly IM injections received FDA approval in 2010, for the treatment of opioid dependence in abstinent opioid users.

Other opioids

Evidence of effects of heroin maintenance compared to methadone are unclear as of 2010. A Cochrane review found some evidence in opioid users who had not improved with other treatments. In Switzerland, Germany, the Netherlands, and the United Kingdom, long-term injecting drug users who do not benefit from methadone and other medication options may be treated with injectable heroin that is administered under the supervision of medical staff. Other countries where it is available include Spain, Denmark, Belgium, Canada, and Luxembourg.

Dihydrocodeine in both extended-release and immediate-release form are also sometimes used for maintenance treatment as an alternative to methadone or buprenorphine in some European countries. Dihydrocodeine is an opioid agonist. It may be used as a second line treatment. A 2020 systematic review found low quality evidence that dihydrocodeine may be no more effective than other routinely used medication interventions in reducing illicit opiate use.

An extended-release morphine confers a possible reduction of opioid use and with fewer depressive symptoms but overall more adverse effects when compared to other forms of long-acting opioids. Retention in treatment was not found to be significantly different. It is used in Switzerland and more recently in Canada.

Behavioral therapy

Cognitive behavioral therapy
Cognitive behavioral therapy (CBT), a form of psychosocial intervention that is used to improve mental health, may not be as effective as other forms of treatment. CBT primarily focuses on an individual's coping strategies to help change their cognition, behaviors and emotions about the problem. This intervention has demonstrated success in many psychiatric conditions (e.g., depression) and substance use disorders (e.g., tobacco). However, the use of CBT alone in opioid dependence has declined due to the lack of efficacy, and many are relying on medication therapy or medication therapy with CBT, since both were found to be more efficacious than CBT alone. A form of CBT therapy known as motivational interviewing (MI) is often used opioid use disorder. MI leverages a person intrinsic motivation to recover through education, formulation of relapse prevention strategies, reward for adherence to treatment guidelines, and positive thinking to keep motivation high—which are based on a person's socioeconomic status, gender, race, ethnicity, sexual orientation, and their readiness to recover.

Twelve-step programs

While medical treatment may help with the initial symptoms of opioid withdrawal, once the first stages of withdrawal are through, a method for long-term preventative care is attendance at 12-step groups such as Narcotics Anonymous. Narcotics Anonymous is a global service that provides multilingual recovery information and public meetings free of charge. Some evidence supports the use of these programs in adolescents as well.

The 12-step program is an adapted form of the Alcoholics Anonymous program. The program strives to help create behavioural change by fostering peer-support and self-help programs. The model helps assert the gravity of addiction by enforcing the idea that addicts must surrender to the fact that they are addicted and be able to recognize the problem. It also helps maintain self-control and restraint to help promote one's capabilities.

Digital care programs
Digital care programs (see telehealth or digital health) have increased in number since the Coronavirus pandemic mandated the increased usage of remote healthcare options. These programs offer treatment and continuing care remotely, via smartphone and desktop applications. This often includes remote substance testing, access to peer support meetings, recovery coaching or therapy, and self-guided learning modules. Examples of digital care programs for opioid use disorder include: Chess, Pear Therapeutics, DynamiCare Health, Kaden Health and WeConnect.

Epidemiology

Globally, the number of people with opioid dependence increased from 10.4 million in 1990 to 15.5 million in 2010. In 2016, the numbers rose to 27 million people who experienced this disorder. Opioid use disorders resulted in 122,000 deaths worldwide in 2015, up from 18,000 deaths in 1990. Deaths from all causes rose from 47.5 million in 1990 to 55.8 million in 2013.

United States

The current epidemic of opioid abuse is the most lethal drug epidemic in American history. In 2008, there were four times as many deaths due to overdose than there were in 1999. In 2017, in the US, "the age-adjusted drug poisoning death rate involving opioid analgesics increased from 1.4 to 5.4 deaths per 100,000 population between 1999 and 2010, decreased to 5.1 in 2012 and 2013, then increased to 5.9 in 2014, and to 7.0 in 2015. The age-adjusted drug poisoning death rate involving heroin doubled from 0.7 to 1.4 deaths per 100,000 resident population between 1999 and 2011 and then continued to increase to 4.1 in 2015."

In 2017, the U.S. Department of Health and Human Services (HHS) announced a public health emergency due to an increase in the misuse of opioids. The administration introduced a strategic framework called the Five-Point Opioid Strategy, which includes providing access recovery services, increasing the availability of reversing agents for overdose, funding opioid misuse and pain research, changing treatments of people managing pain, and updating public health reports related to combating opioid drug misuse.

The US epidemic in the 2000s is related to a number of factors. Rates of opioid use and dependency vary by age, sex, race, and socioeconomic status. With respect to race the discrepancy in deaths is thought to be due to an interplay between physician prescribing and lack of access to healthcare and certain prescription drugs. Men are at higher risk for opioid use and dependency than women, and men also account for more opioid overdoses than women, although this gap is closing. Women are more likely to be prescribed pain relievers, be given higher doses, use them for longer durations, and may become dependent upon them faster.

Deaths due to opioid use also tend to skew at older ages than deaths from use of other illicit drugs. This does not reflect opioid use as a whole, which includes individuals in younger age demographics. Overdoses from opioids are highest among individuals who are between the ages of 40 and 50, in contrast to heroin overdoses, which are highest among individuals who are between the ages of 20 and 30. 21- to 35-year-olds represent 77% of individuals who enter treatment for opioid use disorder, however, the average age of first-time use of prescription painkillers was 21.2 years of age in 2013. Among the middle class means of acquiring funds have included Elder financial abuse through a vulnerability of financial transactions of selling items and international dealers noticing a lack of enforcement in their transaction scams throughout the Caribbean.

Since 2018, with the US federal government's passing of the SUPPORT (Substance Use-Disorder Prevention That Promotes Opioid Recovery and Treatment for Patients and Communities Act) Act, federal restrictions on methadone use for patients receiving Medicare have been lifted. Since March 2020, as a result of the COVID-19 pandemic, buprenorphine may be dispensed via telemedicine in the U.S.

In October 2021, New York Governor Kathy Hochul signed legislation to combat the opioid crisis. This included establishing a program for the use of medication-assisted substance use disorder treatment for incarcerated individuals in state and local correctional facilities, decriminalizing the possession and sale of hypodermic needles and syringes, establishing an online directory for distributors of opioid antagonists, and expanding the number of eligible crimes committed by individuals with a substance use disorder that may be considered for diversion to a substance use treatment program. Until these laws were signed, incarcerated New Yorkers did not reliably have access to medication-assisted treatment and syringe possession was still a class A misdemeanor despite New York authorizing and funding syringe exchange and access programs. This legislation acknowledges the ways New York State laws have contributed to opioid deaths: in 2020 more than 5112 people died from overdoses in New York State, with 2192 deaths in New York City.

History
Opiate misuse has been recorded at least since 300 BC. Greek mythology describes Nepenthe (Greek “free from sorrow”) and how it was used by the hero of the Odyssey.'' Opioids have been used in the Near East for centuries. The purification of and isolation of opiates occurred in the early 19th century.

Levacetylmethadol was previously used to treat opioid dependence. In 2003 the drug's manufacturer discontinued production. There are no available generic versions. LAAM produced long-lasting effects, which allowed the person receiving treatment to visit a clinic only three times per week, as opposed to daily as with methadone. In 2001, levacetylmethadol was removed from the European market due to reports of life-threatening ventricular rhythm disorders. In 2003, Roxane Laboratories, Inc. discontinued Orlaam in the US.

See also 
Benzodiazepine withdrawal syndrome
Doctor shopping
Hyperkatifeia, hypersensitivity to emotional distress in the context of opioid abuse
Prescription drug abuse

References

Further reading 
 
 
 Seabra, P., Sequeira, A., Filipe, F., Amaral, P., Simões, A., & Sequeira, R. (2022). Substance addiction consequences: outpatients severity indicators in a medication-based program. International Journal of Mental Health & Addiction, 20(3), 1837–1853. https://doi.org/10.1007/s11469-021-00485-3

External links 
 Heroin information from the National Institute on Drug Abuse
 Opioid Dependence Treatment and Guidelines

Substance dependence
Dependence
Wikipedia medicine articles ready to translate